The following highways in Virginia have been known as State Route 64:
 State Route 64 (Virginia 1933-1940), Tennessee to Lebanon, Virginia
 State Route 64 (Virginia 1940-1958), now part of State Route 63
 Interstate 64 in Virginia, 1957–present